Dicranopygium is a genus of plants belonging to the family Cyclanthaceae, first described as a genus in 1954. They are distributed in the Neotropical realm from southern Mexico to Peru.

Species
Species include:

 Dicranopygium amazonicum - NW Brazil 
 Dicranopygium angustissimum - Guyana 
 Dicranopygium aristeguietae - Venezuela 
 Dicranopygium arusisense - Colombia 
 Dicranopygium atrovirens - Colombia 
 Dicranopygium aurantiacum - Colombia 
 Dicranopygium bolivarense - Venezuela 
 Dicranopygium calimense - Colombia, Ecuador 
 Dicranopygium callithrix - Colombia 
 Dicranopygium campii - Ecuador 
 Dicranopygium coma-pyrrhae - Ecuador 
 Dicranopygium crinitum - Panama 
 Dicranopygium cuatrecasanum - Panama, Colombia, Ecuador 
 Dicranopygium dolichostemon - Colombia 
 Dicranopygium euryphyllum - Ecuador 
 Dicranopygium fissile - Colombia 
 Dicranopygium globosum - Colombia 
 Dicranopygium goudotii - Colombia 
 Dicranopygium gracile - Veracruz, Oaxaca, Guatemala, Honduras, Nicaragua 
 Dicranopygium grandifolium - Costa Rica, Colombia, Venezuela, Ecuador 
 Dicranopygium harlingii - Costa Rica, Panama 
 Dicranopygium idrobonis - Colombia 
 Dicranopygium imeriense - Guyana, Venezuela, NW Brazil 
 Dicranopygium insulare - Tobago 
 Dicranopygium latissimum - Peru 
 Dicranopygium lugonis  - Ecuador, Peru 
 Dicranopygium macrophyllum - Venezuela 
 Dicranopygium microcephalum - Costa Rica, Honduras 
 Dicranopygium mirabile - Colombia 
 Dicranopygium nanum - Guyana, Venezuela 
 Dicranopygium novogranatense - Colombia 
 Dicranopygium odoratum - Colombia 
 Dicranopygium omichlophilum  - Venezuela, Colombia 
 Dicranopygium pachystemon - Peru 
 Dicranopygium parvulum - Colombia 
 Dicranopygium polycephalum - Colombia 
 Dicranopygium pygmaeum - Colombia, the Guianas 
 Dicranopygium rheithrophilum - Colombia, Ecuador 
 Dicranopygium robustum - Amazonas in Venezuela 
 Dicranopygium rupestre - Venezuela 
 Dicranopygium sanctae-martae - Colombia 
 Dicranopygium sararense - Colombia 
 Dicranopygium schultesii - Colombia, Ecuador 
 Dicranopygium scoparum - Colombia 
 Dicranopygium stenophyllum - Ecuador 
 Dicranopygium tatica - Costa Rica 
 Dicranopygium testaceum - Panama, Colombia 
 Dicranopygium trianae - Colombia 
 Dicranopygium umbrophilum - Nicaragua, Costa Rica, Panama 
 Dicranopygium venezuelanum - Venezuela  
 Dicranopygium wallisii - Costa Rica, Panama, Colombia 
 Dicranopygium wedelii- Nicaragua, Costa Rica, Panama, Honduras 
 Dicranopygium williamsii - Ecuador, Peru 
 Dicranopygium yacu-sisa - Ecuador, Peru, Colombia, Venezuela

References

External links
 Hammel, B. E. (2003). New Species of Cyclanthaceae from southern Central America and northern South America. Novon 13 52–63.

Cyclanthaceae
Pandanales genera